Carex lucorum is a tussock-forming species of perennial sedge in the family Cyperaceae. It is native to eastern parts of Canada and north eastern parts of the United States.

See also
List of Carex species

References

lucorum
Taxa named by Carl Ludwig Willdenow
Plants described in 1814
Flora of Connecticut
Flora of Illinois
Flora of Kentucky
Flora of Maine
Flora of Maryland
Flora of Massachusetts
Flora of Michigan
Flora of Minnesota
Flora of New Brunswick
Flora of New Hampshire
Flora of New Jersey
Flora of New York (state)
Flora of Nova Scotia
Flora of Ohio
Flora of Ontario
Flora of Pennsylvania
Flora of Quebec
Flora of Rhode Island
Flora of Vermont
Flora of Tennessee
Flora of Wisconsin